Minjavan may refer to:
Minjavan District
Minjavan-e Gharbi Rural District
Minjavan-e Sharqi Rural District